Legislative elections were held in South Korea on 12 April 1996. The result was a victory for the New Korea Party, which won 139 of the 299 seats in the National Assembly. Voter turnout was 63.9%. Although the New Korea Party remained the largest party in the National Assembly, it failed to win the majority.

Political parties

The governing New Korea Party (formerly the Democratic Liberal Party) of President Kim Young-sam, lost its absolute parliamentary majority. The election was held three years into President Kim's five year mandate.

The opposition National Congress for New Politics was formed by veteran opposition leader Kim Dae-jung and his supporters in the Democratic Party. Kim had retired from politics following his loss in the 1992 Presidential election but formed the new party after his return in 1995.

The right-wing United Liberal Democrats was led by former Prime Minister of South Korea Kim Jong-pil, a former ally of President Kim. He had been a member of the former ruling Democratic Liberal Party but broke with it after Kim's victory in 1992. It joined with Kim Dae Jung's opposition and formed coalition.

The United Democratic Party had once been the premier opposition party. It supported Kim Dae-jung's unsuccessful Presidential campaign in 1992 and was the largest opposition party in the outgoing National Assembly. However, following the defection of Kim and his supporters, the party was reduced to a minor force. It later merged to Kim Young-sam's party.

Results

By city or province

Notes

References

External links
1996 elections in South Korea Inter-Parliamentary Union

Legislative elections in South Korea
Parliamentary election